Barbara Jordan defeated Sharon Walsh in the final, 6–3, 6–3 to win the women's singles tennis title at the 1979 Australian Open. It was her first major title and first tour-level title overall.

Chris O'Neil was the reigning champion, but did not compete this year.

This was only the second women's singles final not to feature an Australian player, the first being in 1935. This was also the first all-American final at the tournament.

Seeds
The seeded players are listed below. They are ordered by the round in which they were knocked out.

 Virginia Ruzici (first round)
 Hana Mandlíková (quarterfinals)
 Renáta Tomanová (semifinals)
 Sharon Walsh (finalist)
 Barbara Jordan (champion)
 n/a
 Janet Newberry (quarterfinals)
 Cynthia Doerner (quarterfinals)

Note: The sixth seed withdrew and was replaced by Cathy Griffiths.

Qualifying

Draw

Finals

Earlier rounds

Section 1

Section 2

References

External links
 1979 Australian Open – Women's draws and results at the International Tennis Federation

Women's singles
Australian Open (tennis) by year – Women's singles
1979 in Australian women's sport
1980 in Australian women's sport
1979 WTA Tour